Brachycrus is an extinct genus of oreodont, of the family Merycoidodontidae, endemic to North America.

 
Brachycrus had jaws which were short, and because the nostrils were placed far to the back, the creature is presumed to have had a tapir-like proboscis.

References

Oreodonts
Miocene even-toed ungulates
Miocene mammals of North America
Fossil taxa described in 1901
Prehistoric even-toed ungulate genera